The 16th Standing Committee of the Central Commission for Discipline Inspection (CCDI) was elected at the 1st Plenary Session of the 16th CCDI and then endorsed by the 1st Plenary Session of the 16th Central Committee on 15 November 2002.

Members

References
General
The 16th CCDI Standing Committee composition was taken from this source:
  
Specific

Central Commission for Discipline Inspection
1997 establishments in China
2002 disestablishments in China